SMS G85 was a 1913 Type Large Torpedo Boat (Großes Torpedoboot) of the Imperial German Navy (Kaiserliche Marine) during World War I, and the 40th ship of her class.

Construction

Built by Germaniawerft in Kiel, Germany, she was launched in December 1915.  The "G" in G85 refers to the shipyard at which she was constructed.

Service

In this action, two groups of German destroyers set out to bombard Allied positions ashore at Dover, England and Calais, France. However, Swift intercepted G85 and sank her with a torpedo.

 was also sunk in this action.

References
 Technical specs of the Großes Torpedoboot 1913 class

Torpedo boats of the Imperial German Navy
1915 ships
Ships built in Kiel
World War I torpedo boats of Germany
Maritime incidents in 1917
World War I shipwrecks in the North Sea